"A Minute to Pray and a Second to Die" is the second single released from Scarface's debut album, Mr. Scarface Is Back. Released on February 28, 1992, and produced by Crazy C and Scarface, "A Minute to Pray and a Second to Die" made it to two Billboard charts, peaking at 69 on the Hot R&B/Hip-Hop Singles & Tracks" and 13 on the Hot Rap Singles. The song features a sample of Marvin Gaye's "Inner City Blues". A music video for the song was also released shortly after, which mirrors Scarface's storytelling descriptions mostly scene after scene.

Track listing

A-Side
"A Minute to Pray and a Second to Die" (Radio)- 4:44  
"A Minute to Pray and a Second to Die" (Urban Radio)- 4:45  
"A Minute to Pray and a Second to Die" (Instrumental)- 4:44

B-Side
"A Minute to Pray and a Second to Die" (Club mix)- 4:45  
"I'm Dead" (Radio)- 2:06  
"I'm Dead" (Club mix)- 4:51 

1992 singles
Scarface (rapper) songs
Gangsta rap songs
1991 songs